Sudarshan Sahoo (born 11 March 1939) is an Indian sculpture artist from Puri in Odisha. He was awarded India's second highest civilian award Padma Vibhushan in 2021 and India's fourth highest civilian award Padma Shri in 1988.

Sahoo established Sudarshan Crafts Museum, Puri in 1977 and Sudarshan Art & Crafts Village, Bhubaneswar in 1991 with the help of the Government of Odisha.

Awards and recognition
He received the National Award for stone carving in 1981, India's fourth highest civilian award Padma Shri in 1988, Shilp Guru award in 2003, Odisha Lalit Kala Academy's Dharmapada award in 2012 and India's second highest civilian award Padma Vibhushan  in 2021.

References

1939 births
Living people
People from Puri
Recipients of the Padma Shri in arts
20th-century Indian sculptors
Indian male sculptors
20th-century Indian male artists